Lalić is a surname. Notable people with the surname include:

 Aleksandra Lalić, Serbian fashion designer
 Bogdan Lalić, Croatian chess grandmaster
 Dražen Lalić, Croatian sociologist
 Gojko Lalić, Serbian American chemistry professor
 Ivan V. Lalić, Serbian poet
 Luka Lalić, Serbian football coach
 Maja Vidaković Lalić, Serbian architect
 Maria Lalić, British artist
 Marin Lalić, Croatian football player
 Mihailo Lalić, novelist of Serbian and Montenegrin literature
 Nataša Lalić, Serbian politician
 Slobodan Lalić, Serbian football player
 Susan Lalic, British chess grandmaster
 Veljko Lalić, Serbian journalist, editor and publicist
 Vik Lalić, Croatian football player
 Žanamari Lalić, Croatian pop singer

See also
 Lalich, anglicized version

Croatian surnames
Serbian surnames